Pogi Years Old  is the tenth studio album by Filipino rock band Parokya ni Edgar. The album was released on October 17, 2016 nationwide and on digital format through Universal Records. Long-time member and backup vocalist Vinci Montaner appears as a featured artist on the album. This marks the first studio album after 6 years since 2010's Middle-Aged Juvenile Novelty Pop Rockers.

Overview
The cover was revealed on September 2, 2016 and it was announced that former member Vinci Montaner would appear on the album as a featured artist. The title was also revealed to be titled Pogi Years Old. On September 9, 2016, the band held a free surprise show at the Bonifacio Shrine in Manila. The band held an album launch at Eastwood Central Plaza on October 16, 2016.

In a press conference held last October 19, 2016, Chito Miranda shared that "Wala Lang Yun" and "Friendzone Mo Mukha Mo" are songs he wrote for his wife Neri Naig.

Track listing

Personnel
Parokya ni Edgar
Chito Miranda – lead vocals 
Buwi Meneses – bass guitar
Darius Semaña – lead guitar 
Gab Chee Kee – rhythm guitar, backing vocals 
Dindin Moreno – drums, percussion

Additional musicians
Vinci Montaner – backup vocals, lead vocals on "Beautiful Girl"
Rico Blanco – vocals on "Sing" and "Panahon Na Naman ng Harana"
Frank Magalona, Gloc 9 – rapping on "Ang Parokya"
Paolo Bernaldo – bass guitar

References

2016 albums
Parokya ni Edgar albums
Universal Records (Philippines) albums